Jersey Airlines was an early post-World War II private, independent British airline formed in 1948. In 1952, the airline operated its first scheduled service. Four years later, British European Airways (BEA) took a 25% minority stake in Jersey Airlines and made it an "associate". In June 1958, a Jersey Airlines de Havilland Heron became the first commercial airliner to arrive at the newly reconstructed Gatwick Airport. In 1960, Jersey Airlines ordered four state-of-the-art Handley Page Dart Herald 200 series turboprops. By 1962, BEA had sold its 25% minority holding in Jersey Airlines. The same year, Jersey Airlines became part of the British United Airways (BUA) group of companies. In August 1963, Jersey Airlines changed its trading name to British United (C.I.) Airways. Following the BUA group's 1967/8 reorganisation, BUA (C.I.) was absorbed into British United Island Airways (BUIA) in November 1968.

History
During the summer of 1948, Welshman Maldwyn L. Thomas was working for a car rental company in St. Helier, Jersey, and arranged ad hoc charters for day trippers to be flown from London's Croydon Airport to Dinard in Brittany, France. Due to the growing popularity of these trips, in November of that year, he decided to form a company to offer such charter flights on a regular basis. That company was to be incorporated under the name Jersey Airlines Limited. However, its similarity to an existing company named Jersey Airways Limited, a recently nationalised airline that was absorbed into BEA, resulted in the new company being registered as Airlines (Jersey) Limited and using Jersey Airlines as its trading name.

In 1952, Jersey Airlines entered the scheduled service market. All scheduled services were marketed as Duchess Services. To aid the development of its scheduled route network, the airline concluded an "association" agreement with BEA. This also resulted in BEA acquiring a 25% minority shareholding in Jersey Airlines in 1956 and entailed the transfer of BEA's Southampton—Guernsey and Southampton—Alderney routes. By winter 1956, Jersey Airlines' scheduled route network included Croydon, Bournemouth, Exeter, Manchester, and Southampton in England, Alderney, Guernsey and Jersey from the Channel Islands, as well as Cherbourg, Dinard, Nantes, Saint-Brieuc and Paris Orly in France and Bilbao in Spain.

By May 1958, Jersey Airlines moved its main UK mainland operating base from Croydon to Gatwick. One of the airline's de Havilland Herons operated the first scheduled flight to arrive at the newly reconstructed airport.

At the 1960 Farnborough Airshow, Jersey Airlines placed an order for four brand-new, 50-seat Handley Page Dart Herald 200 turboprop airliners, each of which was powered by two Rolls-Royce Dart 7 engines, for delivery the following year. When Mr M.L. Thomas, the airline's chairman and managing director, signed the contract later that year, the number of aircraft on firm order was increased to six series 200 Dart Heralds. The first two were to be delivered in 1961, a further two in 1962 and the final two in 1963. Unforeseen design and production problems delayed the delivery of the first batch until summer 1962. To enable Jersey Airlines to introduce the Dart Herald into commercial service at the start of the 1962 summer timetable as planned, Handley Page supplied three interim aircraft - two smaller 44-seat Herald 100s as well as one 50-seat Herald 200. One of the two 100 series aircraft was the Herald's prototype/demonstrator while the other was the first production aircraft to be delivered to BEA. The first of Jersey Airlines' own aircraft sporting the airline's blue and gold livery including the civil air ensign on the tail was finally handed over to the airline in January 1963. Another three aircraft were delivered later the same year, resulting in most scheduled routes being served with the new turboprop type. Jersey Airlines marketed its new turboprops as Herald Class. (The older DC-3 and Heron piston airliners were marketed as Dakmaster Class and Duchess Class respectively.) The seasonal nature of Jersey Airlines' scheduled operation compelled it to charter Heralds to Lord Brothers, a contemporary package tour operator, as the summer season drew to a close. These planes flew British holidaymakers as far afield as Spain, Morocco, the Canary Islands as well as Athens and the Greek islands.

In 1961, Jersey Airlines carried 310,000 scheduled passengers. The same year, BEA terminated its association agreement with Jersey Airlines as both airlines had become competitors on London—Jersey and London—Guernsey, the most important routes in the London — Channel Islands market, as a result of the Civil Aviation (Licensing) Act that had been enacted the year before. This had abolished the corporations' statutory monopoly on principal domestic and international scheduled routes.

The BUA group's takeover of Jersey Airlines in May 1962 followed BEA's disposal of its minority holding in its former regional "associate" on 31 March of that year. Together with the earlier acquisition of the British Aviation Services group, the Jersey Airlines takeover expanded the BUA group fleet to more than 100 aircraft and increased its payroll to 6,000. It also made BUA bigger than British Overseas Airways Corporation (BOAC) in terms of scheduled passengers carried. By that year's summer, Plymouth, Coventry, Glasgow and Belfast were added to the scheduled route network in the UK, while Amsterdam Schiphol, Nice, Quimper, Dublin and Cork joined the international scheduled route network.

On 1 August 1963, Airlines (Jersey) Ltd dropped the Jersey Airlines trading name in favour of British United (C.I.) Airways and became a wholly owned subsidiary of Air Holdings, the holding company set up by the group's shareholders in November 1961 to facilitate the creation of a large private sector airline through additional acquisitions of rival independent airlines.

The 1967/8 reorganisation of the BUA group's regional activities resulted in the amalgamation of BUA (C.I.), British United (Manx) Airways and Morton Air Services under the BUIA name. The new entity began trading on 1 November 1968.

Fleet 
Jersey Airlines operated the following aircraft types:

de Havilland DH 89 Dragon Rapide
de Havilland DH 114 Heron
Douglas DC-3/C-47
Handley Page HPR.7 Dart Herald 100/200

Fleet in 1962
In April 1962, the fleet of Jersey Airlines comprised 13 aircraft.

Accidents and incidents
There are two recorded accidents. One of these was fatal, the other non-fatal.

 The first accident on 15 August 1958 was non-fatal. It involved a Jersey Airlines de Havilland DH 114 Heron 1B (registration: G-AMYU) operating a freight flight to Guernsey. When the aircraft was on its final approach to Guernsey Airport, the pilot in command carried out a missed approach due to deteriorating weather conditions. The aircraft's second approach was a tailwind approach in the opposite direction. This resulted in the aircraft touching down on the grass next to the runway. Although the aircraft was damaged beyond repair as a result of continuing to slide sideways across a sunken road, the sole occupant (the aircraft's pilot) survived the accident.

 The second accident on 14 April 1965 was fatal. It involved a British United (C.I.) Airways Douglas C-47B-20-DK (registration: G-ANTB) operating British United Airways flight 1030X, a scheduled international passenger flight from Paris Orly to Jersey. Despite the deteriorating weather conditions at Jersey's States Airport, the crew decided to continue its approach to runway 27. This approach was abandoned because runway visual range fell below minima. This caused the aircraft to crash into the approach lights and catch fire, which killed 26 of the 27 occupants (three out of four crew members and all 23 passengers).

See also
 List of defunct airlines of the United Kingdom

Notes
Notes

Citations

References

 (various backdated issues relating to Jersey Airlines, 1948–1968)
 (various backdated issues relating to Jersey Airlines, 1961–1962)

Further reading
  (Aircraft online)

External links

The early Days
The Family Firm
Jersey Airlines at the Aviation Safety Network Database
airline timetable images - British United (C.I.) Airways, formerly Jersey Airlines, Channel Islands
de Havilland DH 114 Heron G-AORG sporting the original Jersey Airlines livery at Coventry Baginton on 14 December 2008

 
Airlines established in 1948
Airlines disestablished in 1968
Defunct airlines of Jersey
British companies established in 1948
1968 disestablishments in Jersey